Sir Arthur David Saunders Goodall,  (9 October 1931 – 22 July 2016)  was  a  British diplomat. He was High Commissioner to India from 1987 to 1991.

Early life
Goodall was born on 9 October 1931 in Blackpool, Lancashire. His paternal grandfather was from Wexford, Ireland.  He was educated at Ampleforth College in North Yorkshire, and Trinity College, Oxford where he gained first class honours.

Military service
Goodall was commissioned as a 2nd Lieutenant in the King's Own Yorkshire Light Infantry in the 1950s, he served in Kenya and Cyprus.

Diplomatic career
Goodall joined the diplomatic service in 1956 and served in Austria, Germany, Indonesia and  Kenya, before spending 1997-1991 as the British High Commissioner, the equivalent of Ambassador, in India. He also spent time working in the Cabinet Office, where he helped negotiate the 1985 Anglo-Irish Agreement.

After his retirement he was Chairman of the Leonard Cheshire Foundation, 1995–2000, and President of the Irish Genealogical Research Society, 1992–2010.

During the 1980s, Goodall was one of the most senior British officials representing the United Kingdom negotiating with the Irish government on Northern Ireland.

Goodall was a Knight of the Order of St. Gregory the Great (KSG).

He died on 22 July 2016 at the age of 84.

Art
Goodall was taught to paint at Ampleforth College, but started to paint seriously some twenty years later after reading Winston Churchill's book Painting as a Pastime. He worked in ink and watercolour, and held one-man shows in North Yorkshire, London, Durham, Hull and Delhi. He published two books of his paintings: Remembering India (1997, Scorpion Cavendish) and Ryedale Pilgrimage (2000, Maxiprint).

References

1931 births
2016 deaths
People educated at Ampleforth College
Alumni of Trinity College, Oxford
British people of Irish descent
British Roman Catholics
High Commissioners of the United Kingdom to India
20th-century British painters
British male painters
Knights Grand Cross of the Order of St Michael and St George
Knights of St. Gregory the Great
People from Blackpool
King's Own Yorkshire Light Infantry officers
Military personnel from Lancashire